Veikko Johannes Törmänen (born 7 June 1945) is a Finnish artist, who paints and makes graphic art. His works were displayed for the first time in a solo exhibition in Oulu, Finland, in 1972.

Törmänen paints abstract works and makes installations. He has collaborated with architects and has made many public works since 1979. His works combine various techniques and materials.

In the 1970s Törmänen painted gouache and water colour works based on a close study of objects. In the end of the 1980s he painted large, structuredcolor fields with events taking place along the sides of the works. At this time he also produced collages of various objects and experimented with different materials. In the beginning of the 1990s he was struck by the shape of dot, stating that at that time he blew up the color fields into the black dots in his works. He was fascinated by the fact that dot is the basic element of industrially produced image. His show in Oulu Art Museum in 1999 was titled "Contrast".

According to art critics Törmänen's art relies on a peculiar diversion of visual sense, dealing with purely aesthetic optical illusion. He has been considered a reducer, whose works consist of colour, form and their interplay. Törmänen states that his aesthetics is the visual experience they produce and that he doesn't tell stories. He says that he has always wanted to embody movement and interaction, a kind of mirroring of different elements with each others.

Among his paintings and installations Törmänen has designed unconventional chairs and other objects. An example of this work is the interior design of the guest room in the State Provincial Office of Oulu with paintings, fireplace, an iron chair and a glass table. He has stated he is not afraid of decoration anymore.

Törmänen was born in Kuusamo, but lives and works in Oulu. He is married to author Sinikka Laine.

Public works 
Moving Out, The Travel, The Time, August, a series of serigraphy, Lassintalo, Oulu, 1978
Celebration Day, oil, Rajakylä primary school, Oulu, 1980
Pause, oil, Myllyoja primary school, Oulu, 1980
Forte Fortissimo, oil/acrylics, Music Hall, Oulu, 1985
East West Home is Best, serigraphy, Knuutilankangas primary school, Oulu, 1989
Northeast, acrylics, Kuusamo library, 1990
Border Remarks, a series of collage, The Center for Youth and Culture, Oulu. 1993
Calendar, collage, The State Provincial Office of Oulu, 1995
Arche of Life, mural, Oulu Cathedral, 1997
Grid, painting on concrete, Laanila school, 2002
Blossoming, steel/acrylics, Jouni La Réserve, Nice, 2006
Upwards, acrylics, Modern Art Museum Ars Nova, Turku, 2007
 Reflection, ODL Health Centre, Oulu, 2008

Literature 
 Ilpo Okkonen, Ullamaria Pallasmaa: Reunahuomautuksia. Veikko Törmänen teoksia 1975-2007, Studio Ilpo Okkonen Oy, 2008  
 Reijo Rinnekangas: Pohjoista valoa, Pohjoinen, 1990

External links 
 
Grid, Oulu City Art Museum 
Suomen Kuvataiteilijat -verkkomatrikkeli: Veikko Törmänen 
Veikko Törmänen, Contrast, Paintings and Installations in Oulu City Art Museum 8 March – 30 May 1999 
Veikko Törmänen, Oulu City Art Museum 

1945 births
Living people
People from Kuusamo
Contemporary painters
Finnish installation artists
20th-century Finnish painters
21st-century Finnish painters
21st-century male artists
Finnish printmakers
20th-century printmakers
Finnish male painters
20th-century Finnish male artists